Duane Robert Quam II (born July 2, 1960) is an American politician serving in the Minnesota House of Representatives since 2011. A member of the Republican Party of Minnesota, Quam represents District 24A in southeast Minnesota, including the cities of Kasson and Byron, parts of Rochester, and parts of Dodge and Olmsted Counties. He is an engineer.

Early life, education, and career
Quam was raised on a farm and graduated from Byron High School in Byron, and from the University of Texas at Dallas, earning his B.S. in engineering and his M.S. in physics. He is a former member of the Byron School Board, a past chair of the Zumbro Education District governing board, a past chair of the Minnesota State Academic Science Standards writing committee, and a past United Way Community Resource Allocation Committee member, and serves as a consultant on educational texts and a participant on several MCA committees.

Minnesota House of Representatives
Quam was elected to the Minnesota House of Representatives in 2010, running after incumbent Randy Demmer resigned to run for Minnesota's 1st congressional district, and has been reelected every two years since.

Quam serves as the minority lead for the Property Tax Division of the Taxes Committee and also serves on the Elections Finance and Policy, Health Finance and Policy and Human Services Finance Committees.

2018 debate incident
In October 2018, Quam made headlines when he snatched a microphone from the hand of his opponent, Jamie Mahlberg, during a debate. Quam later tried to hand the mic back to Mahlberg. When she did not take it, he dropped it back in front of her. Quam later apologized. Quam was reelected with 53.6% of the vote.

Electoral history

References

External links 

 Rep. Quam Web Page
 Project Votesmart – Rep. Duane Quam Profile
 Duane Quam Campaign Web Site

1960 births
Living people
Politicians from Rochester, Minnesota
Republican Party members of the Minnesota House of Representatives
University of Texas at Dallas alumni
21st-century American politicians
People from Olmsted County, Minnesota